"I Wouldn't Want to Live If You Didn't Love Me" is a song written by Al Turney, and recorded by American country music artist Don Williams.  It was released in June 1974 as the first single from the album Don Williams Vol. III.  The song was Williams' sixth release as a solo artist and his first of seventeen number ones on the country singles chart in Billboard Magazine.  The single spent one week at the top and total of twelve weeks on the chart.

The song also became the first No. 1 hit for producer Allen Reynolds. In the years since, Reynolds produced many No. 1 hits for artists like Crystal Gayle, Dickey Lee, Kathy Mattea and The O'Kanes, but during the 1990s became most associated with producing the hits of Garth Brooks.

Chart performance

References

1974 singles
Don Williams songs
Song recordings produced by Allen Reynolds
Dot Records singles
1974 songs